The 2022 Scotties Tournament of Hearts, Canada's national women's curling championship, was held from January 28 to February 6 at the Fort William Gardens in Thunder Bay, Ontario. The winning team represented Canada at the 2022 World Women's Curling Championship at the CN Centre in Prince George, British Columbia.

Due to the COVID-19 pandemic and Ontario public health orders, the tournament was held behind closed doors with no public spectators for the second season in a row. As Ontario began to permit a maximum capacity of 500 spectators at indoor sporting events beginning January 31, Curling Canada explored admitting limited public spectators for the playoff draws, but ultimately decided against doing so. Organizers later invited tournament volunteers and junior curlers from the Thunder Bay area to attend the playoff draws.

Teams
Due to COVID-19 pandemic-related concerns, and public health orders in multiple provinces that prohibited sports tournaments, the provincial and territorial playdowns in New Brunswick, Newfoundland and Labrador, Northwest Territories, Ontario (both Ontario and Northern Ontario), Prince Edward Island, and Quebec were cancelled (or in the case of Ontario, postponed until April), with teams being selected by provincial sanctioning bodies.

Source:
{| border=1 cellpadding=5 cellspacing=0
!bgcolor="#FF0000" width="250"| 
!bgcolor="#0000CD" width="250"| 
!bgcolor="#0099FF" width="250"| British Columbia
|-
|Gimli CC, Gimli
Skip: Kerri Einarson
Third: Val Sweeting
Second: Shannon Birchard
Lead: Briane Meilleur
Alternate: Krysten Karwacki
|Saville SC, Edmonton
Skip: Laura Walker
Third: Kate Cameron
Second: Taylor McDonald
Lead: Nadine Scotland
Alternate: Dana Ferguson
|Kelowna CC, Kelowna
Skip: Mary-Anne Arsenault
Third: Jeanna Schraeder
Second: Sasha Carter
Lead: Renee Simons
Alternate: Morgan Muise
|- border=1 cellpadding=5 cellspacing=0
!bgcolor="#FFFF99" width="250"| Manitoba
!bgcolor="#FFFF33" width="250"| New Brunswick
!bgcolor="#DC143C" width="250"| 
|-
|Altona CC, Altona
Skip: Mackenzie Zacharias
Third: Karlee Burgess
Second: Emily Zacharias
Lead: Lauren Lenentine
Alternate: Lori Olson-Johns
|Capital WC, Fredericton
Skip: Andrea Crawford
Third: Sylvie Quillian
Second: Jillian Babin
Lead: Katie Forward
|St. John's CC, St. John's
Skip: Sarah Hill
Third: Kelli Sharpe
Second: Beth Hamilton
Lead: Adrienne Mercer
Alternate: Laura Phillips
|- border=1 cellpadding=5 cellspacing=0
!bgcolor="#228B22" width="250"| Northern Ontario
!bgcolor="#000080" width="250"| 
!bgcolor="#B22222" width="250"| 
|-
|Fort William CC, Thunder Bay
Skip: Krista McCarville
Third: Kendra Lilly
Second: Ashley Sippala
Lead: Sarah Potts
Alternate: Jen Gates
|Dartmouth CC, Dartmouth
Skip: Christina Black
Third: Jenn Baxter
Second: Karlee Everist
Lead: Shelley Barker
Alternate: Carole MacLean
|Woodstock CC, Woodstock
Skip: Hollie Duncan
Third: Megan Balsdon
Second: Rachelle Strybosch
Lead: Tess Bobbie
Alternate: Julie Tippin
|- border=1 cellpadding=5 cellspacing=0
!bgcolor="#006400" width="250"| 
!bgcolor="#00FFFF" width="250"| Quebec
!bgcolor="#33CC00" width="250"| Saskatchewan
|-
|Montague CC, Montague &  Cornwall CC, Cornwall
Skip: Suzanne Birt
Third: Marie Christianson
Second: Meaghan Hughes
Lead: Michelle McQuaid
Alternate: Kathy O'Rourke
|CC Laval-sur-le-Lac, Laval &  Glenmore CC, Dollard-des-Ormeaux
Skip: Laurie St-Georges
Third: Hailey Armstrong
Second: Emily Riley
Lead: Cynthia St-Georges
Alternate: Alanna Routledge
|Moose Jaw Ford CC, Moose Jaw
Skip: Penny Barker
Third: Christie Gamble
Second: Jenna Enge
Lead: Danielle Sicinski
Alternate: Amber Holland
|- border=1 cellpadding=5 cellspacing=0
!bgcolor="#A9A9A9" width="250"| Northwest Territories
!bgcolor="#FFDD500" width="250"| Nunavut
!bgcolor="#800080" width="250"| 
|-
|Yellowknife CC, Yellowknife
Fourth: Jo-Ann Rizzo
Third: Sarah Koltun
Second: Margot Flemming
Skip: Kerry Galusha
Alternate: Megan Koehler
|Iqaluit CC, Iqaluit
Skip: Brigitte MacPhail
Third: Sadie Pinksen
Second: Kaitlin MacDonald
Lead: Alison Taylor
|Whitehorse CC, Whitehorse
Skip: Hailey Birnie
Third: Patty Wallingham
Second: Kerry Campbell
Lead: Kimberly Tuor
Alternate: Stephanie Brown|- border=1 cellpadding=5 cellspacing=0
!bgcolor="#00000" width="250"| 
!bgcolor="#0000CD" width="250"| 
!bgcolor="#1E90FF" width="250"| Wild Card #3
|-
|East St. Paul CC, East St. PaulSkip: Tracy Fleury  
Third: Selena Njegovan
Second: Liz Fyfe
Lead: Kristin MacCuish
Alternate: Robyn Njegovan|Highland CC, ReginaSkip: Chelsea Carey
Third: Jolene Campbell
Second: Stephanie Schmidt
Lead: Jennifer Armstrong
Alternate: Rachel Erickson|Ottawa CC, OttawaSkip: Emma Miskew
Third: Sarah Wilkes
Second: Allison Flaxey
Lead: Joanne Courtney
Alternate: Lynn Kreviazuk|}

CTRS ranking

Source:

Wild card selection
In previous years, a wild card game was played between the top two teams on the Canadian Team Ranking System standings who did not win their provincial championship; the winner of this game was usually granted the final spot in the tournament. However, with many provinces cancelling their provincial championships due to the ongoing COVID-19 pandemic in Canada, thus not allowing many teams to compete for a chance to play at the Scotties, Curling Canada opted to include three wild card teams instead of the usual one. These teams directly qualified and did not participate in a play-in game. This was the second time this format was used, with the first being in 2021.

Round robin standingsFinal Round Robin StandingsRound robin results

All draw times are listed in Eastern Time (UTC−05:00).

Draw 1Friday, January 28, 7:00 pmDraw 2Saturday, January 29, 2:00 pmDraw 3Saturday, January 29, 7:00 pmDraw 4Sunday, January 30, 9:00 amDraw 5Sunday, January 30, 2:00 pmDraw 6Sunday, January 30, 7:00 pmDraw 7Monday, January 31, 9:00 amDraw 8Monday, January 31, 2:00 pmDraw 9Monday, January 31, 7:00 pmDraw 10Tuesday, February 1, 9:00 amDraw 11Tuesday, February 1, 2:00 pmDraw 12Tuesday, February 1, 7:00 pmDraw 13Wednesday, February 2, 9:00 amDraw 14Wednesday, February 2, 2:00 pmDraw 15Wednesday, February 2, 7:00 pmDraw 16Thursday, February 3, 9:00 amDraw 17Thursday, February 3, 1:00 pmDraw 18Thursday, February 3, 7:00 pmTiebreakerFriday, February 4, 9:00 amChampionship round

SemifinalsFriday, February 4, 1:00 pmFinalsFriday, February 4, 7:00 pmPlayoffs

1 vs. 2Saturday, February 5, 7:00 pm3 vs. 4Saturday, February 5, 2:00 pmSemifinalSunday, February 6, 12:00 pmFinalSunday, February 6, 7:00 pmStatistics
Top 5 player percentagesFinal Round Robin Percentages; minimum 6 gamesAwards
The awards and all-star teams were as follows:
All-Star TeamsFirst TeamSkip:  Kerri Einarson, Team Canada
Third:  Val Sweeting, Team Canada
Second:  Shannon Birchard, Team Canada
Lead:  Briane Meilleur, Team CanadaSecond Team''
Skip:  Selena Njegovan, Wild Card 1
Third:  Sarah Wilkes, Wild Card 3
Second:  Ashley Sippala, Northern Ontario
Lead:  Kerry Galusha, Northwest Territories 

Marj Mitchell Sportsmanship Award
 Karlee Everist, Nova Scotia

Joan Mead Builder Award
 Leslie Kerr, inaugural Executive Director of the Northern Ontario Curling Association from 2007 to 2020, after guiding the amalgamation of 5 regional curling associations into the NOCA.

Provincial and territorial playdowns

 2022 Alberta Scotties Tournament of Hearts
 2022 British Columbia Scotties Tournament of Hearts
 2022 Manitoba Scotties Tournament of Hearts
 New Brunswick Scotties Tournament of Hearts: Cancelled.
 Newfoundland and Labrador Scotties Tournament of Hearts: Cancelled.
 Northern Ontario Scotties Tournament of Hearts: Cancelled.
 2022 Northwest Territories Scotties Tournament of Hearts: Cancelled.
 2022 Nova Scotia Scotties Tournament of Hearts
 Nunavut Scotties Tournament of Hearts: Not held.
 2022 Ontario Scotties Tournament of Hearts: Postponed until April (no longer a qualifier) 
 Prince Edward Island Scotties Tournament of Hearts: Cancelled.
 Quebec Scotties Tournament of Hearts: Cancelled.
 2022 Saskatchewan Scotties Tournament of Hearts
 2022 Yukon Scotties Tournament of Hearts was held January 4–5 in Whitehorse. Team Hailey Birnie defeated Laura Eby 2–0 in a best of three series for the championship. Birnie won the first game 6–5 and the second game 8–4.

Notes

References

External links

2022 Scotties Tournament of Hearts
Scotties Tournament of Hearts
Curling in Northern Ontario
Scotties Tournament of Hearts
Scotties Tournament of Hearts
Scotties Tournament of Hearts
Sports competitions in Thunder Bay